The 80th District of the Iowa House of Representatives in the state of Iowa.

Current elected officials
Art Staed is the representative currently representing the district.

Past representatives
The district has previously been represented by:
 Henry C. Mollett, 1971–1973
 Emma Jean Kiser, 1973–1975
 Robert F. Bina, 1975–1981
 James B. Clements, 1981–1983
 Jack E. Woods, 1983–1987
 Tony Bisignano, 1987–1993
 Michael K. Peterson, 1993–1995
 James Drees, 1995–2001
 Rod Roberts, 2001–2003
 James F. Hahn, 2003–2005
 Nathan Reichert, 2005–2011
 Mark Lofgren, 2011–2013
 Larry Sheets, 2013–2019
 Holly Brink, 2019–2023
 Art Staed, 2023–present

References

080